The Man Trailer is a 1934 American pre-Code western film directed by Lambert Hillyer and starring Buck Jones and Cecilia Parker. It was a remake of the 1930 film The Lone Rider which had also starred Jones. It was shot at the Iverson Ranch.

Cast
 Buck Jones as Track Ames aka Dan Lane 
 Cecilia Parker as 	Sally Ryan
 Arthur Vinton as 	Jim Burke
 Clarence Geldert as Sheriff John Ryan
 Steve Clark as 	Sheriff Dave Bishop
 Charles West as 	Gorman
 Tom B. Forman as 	Henchman 
 Lew Meehan as Henchman Pete
 Silver Tip Baker as 	Townsman 
 Dick Botiller as 	Henchman Keno 
 Charles Brinley as 	Deputy Charlie Lathrup 
 Buck Bucko as 	Henchman 
 Roy Bucko as 	Henchman Curly 
 George Chesebro as 	Expressman 
 Tommy Coats as 	Deputy 
 Rube Dalroy as 	Townsman 
 Bud McClure as 	Henchman 
 Artie Ortego as 	Deputy
 Bob Reeves as 	Deputy 
 Jack Rockwell as 	Henchman 
 Francis Walker as 	Deputy

References

Bibliography
 Fetrow, Alan G. . Sound films, 1927-1939: a United States Filmography. McFarland, 1992.
 Pitts, Michael R. Western Movies: A Guide to 5,105 Feature Films. McFarland, 2012.

External links
 

1934 films
1934 Western (genre) films
American Western (genre) films
Films directed by Lambert Hillyer
Columbia Pictures films
American black-and-white films
1930s English-language films
1930s American films
Remakes of American films